Patelloida latistrigata is a species of sea snail, a true limpet, a marine gastropod mollusk in the family Lottiidae, one of the families of true limpets.

Description
Patelloida latistrigata has a spirally coiled shell.

Distribution
South  Australia

References

Lottiidae
Gastropods described in 1865